Prdejci is a village located in the Gevgelija Municipality of North Macedonia.

Demographics
According to the 2002 census, the village had a total of 514 inhabitants. Ethnic groups in the village include:

Macedonians 510
Serbs 2
Others 2

Transport
The village is severed by Prdejci railway station, a small halt just east of the village, with two daily services to/from Skopje.

References

Villages in Gevgelija Municipality